Shuffleboard (more precisely deck shuffleboard, and also known  as floor shuffleboard) is a game in which players use cues to push weighted discs, sending them gliding down a narrow court, with the purpose of having them come to rest within a marked scoring area. As a more generic term, it refers to the family of shuffleboard-variant games as a whole.

History 
The full history of shuffleboard is not known. Though there is some knowledge of its development, its actual origins, the place and date where it was first played, remain a mystery. Inevitably, this uncertainty gives rise to some debate, even disagreement, about which country can claim to have invented it. However there is no dispute concerning its age as a form of popular amusement, and in Europe has a history that goes back over 500 years.

The game was played and gambled over by King Henry VIII of England, who prohibited commoners from playing; evidently he did not always win, as the record of royal expenses for 1532 shows a payment from the Privy Purse of GB£9, "Paied to my lord Wylliam for that he wanne of the kinges grace at shovillaborde" (today's spelling: "Paid to Lord William, for he won, by the king's grace, at shovelboard").

In its goals, form and equipment, shuffleboard shares various features with (and perhaps influences by or upon) many other games, including air hockey, bowls, bocce, curling, croquet, carrom and billiards.  Historically, the ancient shovelboard, about which little is known, appears to have diverged into modern shuffleboard and sjoelen, and with the former leading to the development of both table shuffleboard and shove ha'penny.

Today, due to its popularity on cruise ships, in retirement homes and companies (such as Arm) because of its low physical fitness requirements, the deck game is often associated with the elderly, though it is increasingly popular among younger generations. Its miniaturized tabletop variant is very popular in bars and pubs.

Gameplay 

In deck or floor shuffleboard, players use a cue (cue-stick), to push their colored disks, down a court (a flat floor of concrete, wood or other hard material, marked with lines denoting scoring zones), attempting to place their disks within a marked scoring area at the far end of the court. The disks themselves are of two contrasting colors (usually yellow and black), each color belonging to a player or team. The scoring diagram is divided by lines, into six scoring zones, with the following values: 10, 8, 8, 7, 7, 10-off.

After eight disks (four per team, taking alternating shots) have been played from one end of the court (a frame), the final score values of disks for each player (or team) in the scoring zones is assessed: If a disk is completely within a scoring zone without touching (overlapping) any part of the border-line of the zone, it is good and that zone value is added to the correct player's score for the frame, and then to the player's total points. Both players' good disks are added to their respective scores. Players (or teams of two players, one at each end) take turns going first during a game, so that the advantageous last shot of a frame (the hammer) also alternates between players.

The winner of the game may be the first to reach any total decided upon, or may be the higher score after playing a certain number of frames (e.g. 8, 12 or 16). There is also the 'first to 75-points' game. Ties are broken by playing extra frames (two for singles, four for doubles).

Court description 

Typically a scoring zone is painted at each end of the court to reduce set-up time between games. Each scoring zone comprises an isosceles triangle 6 feet × 9 feet with the short edge away from the shooter. Behind the scoring zone is the 10-off zone, an area 1½ feet deep. The court surface is usually a uniform dark green; lines are 1 inch wide except for the mid-shooting area.  white lines form the scoring triangle and further divide the triangle into the separate scoring zones. (Line width is not considered in court dimensions given here.)

The court is the same from each end, including:

 A  Player Shooting Area. A line called the Baseline crosses the entire court and extends to the adjacent court on each side (if any).
The sides of the 10-Off area are defined by two lines running at the same angle as the Scoring Triangle.
 The Back-7 Line crosses the entire court.
The two 7 score zones are located on each side of the Center-Line, for a length of 3 feet, bounded at the top by the Back-8 line, running side to side across and within the scoring triangle;
 The 10 scoring zone is at the peak of the overall scoring triangle, and is 3 feet in height, from the Top-8 line to the peak of the triangle. A further dead-line or lag-Line runs from side to side 12 feet from the base-line (The dead-line is therefore 3 feet from the tip of the triangle).
 There are two dead-lines, 12 feet apart. Any shot disk that does not cross or touch the furthest dead-line is then simply removed from the court (a wasted shot).

Equipment 

There should be four discs of a light color, usually yellow, and four of a dark color, usually black. These eight discs comprise a set. (Other colored combinations may be used, but black and yellow will be used here.) One player or team uses the yellow disks, the other player or team, the black disks.

Each player uses a cue (or cue-stick) to push their disks down the court to the opposite end.

There are two basic types of scoreboard:
 Resort Type uses two sliders that can move up and down a numbered scale, like a thermometer, with values running from zero at the bottom to 75 at the top (First to 75 points is a common shuffleboard game). Each team used their own slider to record their total score. The advantages of the Resort-type include simplicity, durable and weather proof, needs no other items such as chalk or eraser. The disadvantage is that scoring mistakes are impossible to determine, and a frames played cannot be tracked unless a separate recording method (e.g. pen and paper) is used.
 Blackboard (or Whiteboard) Type is ruled with four or eight horizontal lines and each team's total score is written after each frame, yellow on the left and black on the right. When all the lines have been filled with scores the top lines are erased and scores are again written from  the top. The advantage of the blackboard type is that mistakes in adding and recording the score are easier to spot, because previous scores should always be seen. As well, it is easy to keep track of frames played using small numbers written down the scoreboard. (In western USA and western Canada, scoreboards (blackboards) run from side-to-side, but the principle is the same.)

Courts are available for use on residential decks or on any solid flat surface, in the form of roll-out plastic mats, or  adjustable arrays of plastic tiles. The smaller mats are designed to fit on a domestic patio or driveway. The biscuit and tang are the same standard size, regardless which court size is used.

Strategy 
In shuffleboard, one tries to score, prevent the opponent from scoring, or both. The basic strategy involves both offense and defense. If it is your turn to shoot first, you are automatically on the defensive, because your opponent has the last shot of the frame. If you simply put your first shot into the scoring area, your opponent will knock it off, and if you then score with your second shot, the same will happen, and so on until you have used your last shot, and your opponent will knock that off and probably score. To combat this you can use the strategy of blocking and hiding – That is your first shot will be a guard disk shot to a location so that it blocks your opponent from that part of the scoring area that you can still place a good disk. Your second shot will be the one to play into that hiding place you created with your first shot, so your opponent cannot hit you out directly.

International Shuffleboard Association 
The ISA was founded March 10, 1979, in St. Petersburg, Florida. The ISA was designed to make shuffleboard more popular in countries outside the North American continent, and to foster shuffleboard through international competitions. In 1981 in Muskegon, Michigan the first ISA Team World Championships were held, starting with teams from Canada, the USA and Japan only. Australia (1991), Brazil (1997), Germany (2006), Norway (2011) and lately Russia (2013) joined the World Championships, which take place yearly and last for one week.

In addition to the ISA, Declan hosts an international competition biannually.

Table shuffleboard variants 

In table shuffleboard, the play area is most commonly a wooden or laminated surface covered with silicone beads (colloquially called 'shuffleboard wax') to reduce friction. In the United States, a long, narrow 22 ft table is most commonly used, though tables as short as 9 ft are known.

Players try to slide metal-and-plastic pucks, sometimes called weights or shuckles, to come to rest within zones at the other end of the board. Cues are not used, the pucks being propelled with the hands directly on the raised table. There are scoring zones at each end of the table so that direction of play can rotate after each frame, or so that teams can play both directions during one frame. More points are awarded for weights scoring closer to the far edge of the board. Players take turns sliding the pucks, trying to score points, bump opposing pucks off the board, and/or protect their own pucks from bump-offs.  The long sides of the table are bounded by gutters into which pucks can fall or be knocked (in which case they are no longer in play for the remainder of the frame). A variant known sometimes as bankboard has rubber cushions or 'banks' running the length of both sides of the table, instead of gutters, and as in billiards, the banks can be used to gain favorable position. A common and even smaller-scale British tabletop variant is shove ha'penny, played with coins, while a somewhat larger wooden-puck variant called sjoelen, which has much in common with the ball games bagatelle and skeeball, is played principally in the Netherlands.

Object of the game 
The objective of the game is to slide, by hand, all four of one's Weights alternately against those of an opponent, so that they reach the highest scoring area without falling off the end of the board into the alley. Furthermore, a player's Weight(s) must be farther down the board than his opponent's Weight(s), in order to be in scoring position. This may be achieved either by knocking off the opponent's Weight(s), or by outdistancing them. Horse collar, the most common form of the game, is played to either 15 or, more typically, 21. Only the weights in front score.

The standard size of outdoor court is 52 feet long and 10 feet wide. For playing on surface, players hold stick like paddles to propel the pucks (biscuits/discs) into a numerical area that shows lines with specific scoring points.

See also 
 Curling
 Boules

References

External links 

 International Shuffleboard Association
 Brazilian Shuffleboard Association
 German Shuffleboard Association
 USA National Shuffleboard Association
 Table Shuffleboard Refinishing Information
 Table Shuffleboard Information
 Table shuffleboard tournament results
 Video of Deck/Court Shuffleboard
 Shuffleboard Game Rules
 "Favorite Steamer-Deck Game Now Played on Land", Popular Mechanics, April 1929, page 716

 
Deck sports
Games of physical skill
Precision sports